Epik High Is Here is the tenth studio album by the hip hop group Epik High. It was released in two parts: Part 1 was released on January 18, 2021, while Part 2 was released on February 14, 2022. Both versions were released through OURS Co. and distributed by Genie Music. "Rosario" and "Based On A True Story" served as singles from Part 1 while "Rain Song", "Face ID" and "Gray So Gray" served as singles from Part 2.

Epik High Is Here was well received by music critics. "Rosario" was named one of the 50 Best Songs of 2021 by Rolling Stone while British GQ named Part 2 in their list of the 29 best albums of 2022.

Reception

Track listing

Charts

Weekly charts

Monthly charts

Notes

References 

2021 albums
Epik High albums
Genie Music albums